Megaspilates is a genus of moths and butterflies in the family Geometridae. According to the Natural History Museum, there is only one species within the family of geometridae.

References 

Aspitatini